The 2019–20 season was Futebol Clube do Porto's 110th competitive season and 86th consecutive season in the top flight of Portuguese football. It started with the UEFA Champions League third qualifying round on 7 August 2019 and concluded with the Taça de Portugal final against Benfica on 1 August 2020.

Porto won the 2019–20 Primeira Liga with two matches remaining, following a 2–0 home win against Sporting CP, and thus became Portuguese champions for the 29th time in their history.

Players

Squad information

Transfers and loans

In

Total expending:   €60 million

Out

Total income:  €88 million

Loan return

Loan out

Technical staff

{| class=wikitable
|-
!Position
!Staff
|-
| Head coach ||  Sérgio Conceição
|-
|rowspan=2| Assistant coaches ||  Vítor Bruno
|-
| Siramana Dembélé
|-
| Goalkeeper coach ||  Diamantino Figueiredo
|-
| Exercise Physiologist  ||  Eduardo Oliveira
|-

Pre-season and friendlies

Competitions

Overall record

Primeira Liga

League table

Results summary

Results by round

Matches

Taça de Portugal

Third round

Fourth round

Fifth round

Quarter-finals

Semi-finals

Final

Taça da Liga

Third round

Semi-finals

Final

UEFA Champions League

Third qualifying round

3–3 on aggregate. Krasnodar won on away goals.

UEFA Europa League

Group stage

Knockout phase

Round of 32

Statistics

Appearances and discipline
Numbers in parentheses denote appearances as substitute.

Goalscorers

Clean sheets

References

FC Porto seasons
Porto
Porto
Portuguese football championship-winning seasons